Lago is a census-designated place (CDP) in Cameron County, Texas, United States. The population was 204 at the 2010 census. It is part of the Brownsville–Harlingen Metropolitan Statistical Area.

Geography
Lago is located west of the center of Cameron County at  (26.087960, -97.612821).

Demographics
At the 2000 census there were 246 people, 56 households, and 53 families in the CDP. The population density was 5,718.7 people per square mile (2,374.5/km). There were 57 housing units at an average density of 1,325.1/sq mi (550.2/km).  The racial makeup of the CDP was 8.54% White, 91.46% from other races. Hispanic or Latino of any race were 99.59%.

Of the 56 households 50.0% had children under the age of 18 living with them, 78.6% were married couples living together, 14.3% had a female householder with no husband present, and 3.6% were non-families. 3.6% of households were one person and 3.6% were one person aged 65 or older. The average household size was 4.39 and the average family size was 4.44.

The age distribution was 37.0% under the age of 18, 9.8% from 18 to 24, 26.0% from 25 to 44, 19.1% from 45 to 64, and 8.1% 65 or older. The median age was 26 years. For every 100 females, there were 90.7 males. For every 100 females age 18 and over, there were 82.4 males.

The median income for a household in the CDP was $18,235, and the median family income  was $18,235. Males had a median income of $30,568 versus $6,250 for females. The per capita income for the CDP was $3,346. About 54.3% of families and 70.1% of the population were below the poverty line, including 83.5% of those under the age of 18 and none of those 65 or over.

Education
Lago is served by the San Benito Consolidated Independent School District.

In addition, South Texas Independent School District operates magnet schools that serve the community.

References

Census-designated places in Cameron County, Texas
Census-designated places in Texas